Fernand Yves Jabouin (born May 30, 1979) is a retired Haitian-Canadian mixed martial artist who formerly competed in the Bantamweight division of the Ultimate Fighting Championship. A professional competitor since 2001, Jabouin also formerly competed for the WEC.

Background
Jabouin was born in Haiti, where he lived until he fled the war-torn country with his mother and two siblings, relocating in Canada. Jabouin began practicing the martial arts from a young age, as his father was a fan of Chuck Norris and the young Jabouin would often go to his local movie theatre to watch Kung Fu films. Jabouin attended college and graduated with a degree in Graphic Design, and used to work as an animator for television commercials.

Mixed martial arts career

Early career
Jabouin made his professional debut in 2001 on the regional circuit, fighting mostly in his native Canada and holding a professional record of 14–4 with 11 wins via knockout before being signed by the WEC.

World Extreme Cagefighting
Jabouin made his WEC debut against Raphael Assunção on October 10, 2009 at WEC 43, losing via split decision.

Jabouin was scheduled to face fellow Canadian Mark Hominick on January 10, 2010 at WEC 46, but was forced off the card with an injury.  Jabouin was replaced by Bryan Caraway.

The fight eventually took place on June 20, 2010 at WEC 49.  Jabouin was defeated by Hominick via second-round TKO, in a bout that earned Fight of the Night honors.

Jabouin defeated Brandon Visher via unanimous decision on November 11, 2010 at WEC 52.

Ultimate Fighting Championship
On October 28, 2010, World Extreme Cagefighting merged with the Ultimate Fighting Championship. As part of the merger, all WEC fighters were transferred to the UFC.

Jabouin lost to Pablo Garza on April 30, 2011 at UFC 129, via submission (flying triangle choke) in the first round.

Jabouin won against Ian Loveland by split decision on August 27, 2011 at UFC 134.

Jabouin defeated Walel Watson via split decision December 10, 2011 at UFC 140 in a close back-and-forth fight.

Jabouin was expected to face Mike Easton on May 15, 2012 at UFC on Fuel TV: Korean Zombie vs. Poirier.  However, Easton was forced out of the bout with an injury and replaced by Jeff Hougland. Jabouin showed superior striking and was able to drop Hougland multiple times with a variety of strikes en route to a unanimous decision victory.

Jabouin was knocked out by Brad Pickett in the first round on September 29, 2012 at UFC on Fuel TV 5.

Jabouin was expected to face Johnny Eduardo on March 16, 2013 at UFC 158.  However, on March 6, Eduardo was forced to pull out of the bout citing a shoulder injury.  Jabouin was then pulled from the card as a suitable replacement could not be found on short notice.

Jabouin faced Dustin Pague on June 15, 2013 at UFC 161. He won the back-and-forth fight via split decision.

Jabouin faced Eddie Wineland at UFC on Fox 10. Jabouin lost the fight via TKO in the second round.

Jabouin faced Mike Easton on June 14, 2014 at UFC 174. He won the fight via unanimous decision.

Jabouin faced Thomas Almeida on April 25, 2015 at UFC 186. Jabouin lost the fight via TKO in the first round.

Jabouin faced Felipe Arantes on August 23, 2015 at UFC Fight Night 74. He lost the fight via submission in the first round, and was subsequently released from the promotion.

Mixed martial arts record

|-
|Loss
|align=center|20–11
|Felipe Arantes
|Submission (armbar)
|UFC Fight Night: Holloway vs. Oliveira
|
|align=center|1
|align=center|4:21
|Saskatoon, Saskatchewan, Canada
|
|-
| Loss
|align=center| 20–10
|Thomas Almeida
|TKO (punches)
|UFC 186
|
|align=center|1
|align=center|4:18
|Montreal, Quebec, Canada
|
|-
| Win
|align=center| 20–9
| Mike Easton
| Decision (unanimous)
| UFC 174
| 
|align=center| 3
|align=center| 5:00
|Vancouver, British Columbia, Canada
|
|-
| Loss
|align=center| 19–9
| Eddie Wineland
| TKO (punches)
| UFC on Fox: Henderson vs. Thomson
| 
|align=center| 2
|align=center| 4:16
|Chicago, Illinois, United States
|
|-
| Win
|align=center| 19–8
| Dustin Pague
| Decision (split) 
| UFC 161
| 
|align=center| 3
|align=center| 5:00
|Winnipeg, Manitoba, Canada
| 
|-
| Loss
|align=center| 18–8
| Brad Pickett
| KO (punch)
| UFC on Fuel TV: Struve vs. Miocic
| 
|align=center| 1
|align=center| 3:40
|Nottingham, England
| 
|-
| Win
|align=center| 18–7
| Jeff Hougland
| Decision (unanimous)
| UFC on Fuel TV: Korean Zombie vs. Poirier
| 
|align=center| 3
|align=center| 5:00
|Fairfax, Virginia, United States
| 
|-
| Win
|align=center| 17–7
| Walel Watson
| Decision (split)
| UFC 140
| 
|align=center| 3
|align=center| 5:00
|Toronto, Ontario, Canada
| 
|-
| Win
|align=center| 16–7
| Ian Loveland
| Decision (split)
| UFC 134
| 
|align=center| 3
|align=center| 5:00
|Rio de Janeiro, Brazil
| 
|-
| Loss
|align=center| 15–7
| Pablo Garza
| Submission (flying triangle choke)
| UFC 129
| 
|align=center| 1
|align=center| 4:31
|Toronto, Ontario, Canada
| 
|-
| Win
|align=center| 15–6
| Brandon Visher
| Decision (unanimous)
| WEC 52
| 
|align=center| 3
|align=center| 5:00
|Las Vegas, Nevada, United States
| 
|-
| Loss
|align=center| 14–6
| Mark Hominick
| TKO (punches)
| WEC 49
| 
|align=center| 2
|align=center| 3:21
|Edmonton, Alberta, Canada
| 
|-
| Loss
|align=center| 14–5
| Raphael Assunção
| Decision (split)
| WEC 43
| 
|align=center| 3
|align=center| 5:00
|San Antonio, Texas, United States
| 
|-
| Win
|align=center| 14–4
| J.T. Wells
| KO (spinning back kick)
| XMMA 6: House of Pain
| 
|align=center| 3
|align=center| 4:56
|Montreal, Quebec, Canada
| 
|-
| Win
|align=center| 13–4
| Nayeb Hezam
| TKO (punches)
| UGC 20: Fight to Survive
| 
|align=center| 2
|align=center| N/A
|Montreal, Quebec, Canada
| 
|-
| Win
|align=center| 12–4
| Brad Cardinal
| Decision (unanimous)
| PFP: New Year's Restitution
| 
|align=center| 3
|align=center| 5:00
|Halifax, Nova Scotia, Canada
| 
|-
| Win
|align=center| 11–4
| Daniel Boissonneault
| KO (punches) 
| UGC 19: TKO Night
| 
|align=center| 1
|align=center| 2:27
|Montreal, Quebec, Canada
| 
|-
| Loss
|align=center| 10–4
| Jonathan Brookins
| Submission (elbows)
| Ultimate Warrior Challenge 2
| 
|align=center| 2
|align=center| 3:35
|Jacksonville, Florida, United States
| 
|-
| Win
|align=center| 10–3
| Antoine Coutu
| KO (punches) 
| UGC 18: Xtreme Victory
| 
|align=center| 1
|align=center| 2:02
|Montreal, Quebec, Canada
| 
|-
| Win
|align=center| 9–3
| Eric Lacelle
| TKO (punches) 
| Ultimate Generation Combat 15
| 
|align=center| 1
|align=center| 4:27
|Montreal, Quebec, Canada
| 
|-
| Win
|align=center| 8–3
| Dustin Severs
| Decision
| Ultimate Generation Combat 9
| 
|align=center| N/A
|align=center| N/A
|Montreal, Quebec, Canada
| 
|-
| Loss
|align=center| 7–3
| Sam Stout
| TKO (punch)
| TKO 16: Infernal
| 
|align=center| 1
|align=center| 4:15
|Quebec City, Quebec, Canada
| 
|-
| Win
|align=center| 7–2
| Chad Hamzeh
| TKO (punches)
| Ultimate Generation Combat 7
| 
|align=center| 3
|align=center| N/A
|Montreal, Quebec, Canada
| 
|-
| Win
|align=center| 6–2
| Eric Davidson
| Submission (choke) 
| Ultimate Generation Combat 6
| 
|align=center| 1
|align=center| 1:22
|Montreal, Quebec, Canada
| 
|-
| Win
|align=center| 5–2
| Frederic Poirier
| KO (punches) 
| Ultimate Generation Combat 4
| 
|align=center| 2
|align=center| 1:25
|Montreal, Quebec, Canada
| 
|-
| Win
|align=center| 4–2
| Rachid Aoudj
| KO (punches) 
| Ultimate Generation Combat 3
| 
|align=center| N/A
|align=center| N/A
|Victoriaville, Quebec, Canada
| 
|-
| Win
|align=center| 3–2
| Andy Lalonde
| TKO (punches)
| UCC Proving Ground 8
| 
|align=center| 1
|align=center| 3:12
|Victoriaville, Quebec, Canada
| 
|-
| Win
|align=center| 2–2
| Thierry Quenneville
| KO (punches) 
| Ultimate Generation Combat 1
| 
|align=center| 1
|align=center| N/A
|Victoriaville, Quebec, Canada
| 
|-
| Loss
|align=center| 1–2
| Steve Claveau
| Decision (split)
| UCC 7: Bad Boyz
| 
|align=center| 2
|align=center| 5:00
|Montreal, Quebec, Canada
| 
|-
| Loss
|align=center| 1–1
| Richard Nancoo
| Submission (armbar)
| UCC 6: Redemption
| 
|align=center| 1
|align=center| 4:50
|Montreal, Quebec, Canada
| 
|-
| Win
|align=center| 1–0
| Dave Nicholls
| TKO (corner stoppage)
| UCC 4: Return Of The Super Strikers
| 
|align=center| 1
|align=center| 5:18
|Sherbrooke, Quebec, Canada
|

See also
 List of current UFC fighters
 List of male mixed martial artists
 List of Canadian UFC fighters

References

External links

1979 births
Living people
Haitian male mixed martial artists
Black Canadian mixed martial artists
Canadian male mixed martial artists
Featherweight mixed martial artists
Sportspeople from Montreal
Sportspeople from Port-au-Prince
Haitian emigrants to Canada
Haitian Quebecers
Ultimate Fighting Championship male fighters